Muscular dystrophies (MD) are a genetically and clinically heterogeneous group of rare neuromuscular diseases that cause progressive weakness and breakdown of skeletal muscles over time. The disorders differ as to which muscles are primarily affected, the degree of weakness, how fast they worsen, and when symptoms begin. Some types are also associated with problems in other organs.

Over 30 different disorders are classified as muscular dystrophies. Of those, Duchenne muscular dystrophy (DMD) accounts for approximately 50% of cases and affects males beginning around the age of four. Other relatively common muscular dystrophies include Becker muscular dystrophy, facioscapulohumeral muscular dystrophy, and myotonic dystrophy, whereas limb–girdle muscular dystrophy and congenital muscular dystrophy are themselves groups of several – usually ultrarare – genetic disorders.

Muscular dystrophies are caused by mutations in genes, usually those involved in making muscle proteins. These mutations are either inherited from parents or may occur spontaneously during early development. Muscular dystrophies may be X-linked recessive, autosomal recessive, or autosomal dominant. Diagnosis often involves blood tests and genetic testing.

There is no cure for any disorder from the muscular dystrophy group. Several drugs designed to address the root cause are under development, including gene therapy (Microdystrophin), and antisense drugs (Ataluren, Eteplirsen etc.).  Other medications used include corticosteroids (Deflazacort), calcium channel blockers (Diltiazem) to slow skeletal and cardiac muscle degeneration, anticonvulsants to control seizures and some muscle activity, and immunosuppressants (Vamorolone) to delay damage to dying muscle cells. Physical therapy, braces, and corrective surgery may help with some symptoms while assisted ventilation may be required in those with weakness of breathing muscles.

Outcomes depend on the specific type of disorder. Many affected people will eventually become unable to walk and Duchenne muscular dystrophy in particular is associated with shortened life expectancy.

Muscular dystrophy was first described in the 1830s by Charles Bell. The word "dystrophy" comes from the Greek dys, meaning "no, un-" and troph- meaning "nourish".

Signs and symptoms
The signs and symptoms consistent with muscular dystrophy are:

Causes
The majority of muscular dystrophies are inherited; the different muscular dystrophies follow various inheritance patterns (X-linked, autosomal recessive or autosomal dominant). In a small percentage of patients, the disorder may have been caused by a de novo (spontaneous) mutation.

Diagnosis
The diagnosis of muscular dystrophy is based on the results of muscle biopsy, increased creatine phosphokinase (CpK3), electromyography, and genetic testing. A physical examination and the patient's medical history will help the doctor determine the type of muscular dystrophy. Specific muscle groups are affected by different types of muscular dystrophy.

Classification

Management

Currently, there is no cure for muscular dystrophy. In terms of management, physical therapy, occupational therapy, orthotic intervention (e.g., ankle-foot orthosis), speech therapy, and respiratory therapy may be helpful. Low intensity corticosteroids such as prednisone, and deflazacort may help to maintain muscle tone. Orthoses (orthopedic appliances used for support) and corrective orthopedic surgery may be needed to improve the quality of life in some cases. The cardiac problems that occur with Emery–Dreifuss muscular dystrophy (EDMD) and myotonic muscular dystrophy may require a pacemaker. The myotonia (delayed relaxation of a muscle after a strong contraction) occurring in myotonic muscular dystrophy may be treated with medications such as quinine.

Occupational therapy assists the individual with MD to engage in activities of daily living (such as self-feeding and self-care activities) and leisure activities at the most independent level possible. This may be achieved with use of adaptive equipment or the use of energy-conservation techniques.  Occupational therapy may implement changes to a person's environment, both at home or work, to increase the individual's function and accessibility; furthermore, it addresses psychosocial changes and cognitive decline which may accompany MD, and provides support and education about the disease to the family and individual.

Prognosis
Prognosis depends on the individual form of muscular dystrophy. Some dystrophies cause progressive weakness and loss of muscle function, which may result in severe physical disability and a life-threatening deterioration of respiratory muscles or heart. Other dystrophies do not affect life expectancy and only cause relatively mild impairment.

History
In the 1860s, descriptions of boys who grew progressively weaker, lost the ability to walk, and died at an early age became more prominent in medical journals. In the following decade, French neurologist Guillaume Duchenne gave a comprehensive account of the most common and severe form of the disease, which now carries his name – Duchenne MD.

Society and culture 
In 1966 in the US and Canada, Jerry Lewis and the Muscular Dystrophy Association (MDA) began the annual Labor Day telecast The Jerry Lewis Telethon, significant in raising awareness of muscular dystrophy in North America. Disability rights advocates, however, have criticized the telethon for portraying those living with the disease as deserving pity rather than respect.

On December 18, 2001, the MD CARE Act was signed into law in the US; it amends the Public Health Service Act to provide research for the various muscular dystrophies. This law also established the Muscular Dystrophy Coordinating Committee to help focus research efforts through a coherent research strategy.

See also

References

Further reading

External links 

 

 
Genetic disorders by system
Myoneural junction and neuromuscular diseases
Wikipedia medicine articles ready to translate

no:Duchenne muskeldystrofi